The Waupun Carnegie Library building is in Waupun, Wisconsin and currently serves as the Waupun Heritage Museum.

History
A Carnegie library, the building began construction October 11, 1904 and was completed a year later on October 22, 1905. It served in its original function as the library until 1968 when a new library was completed. It was leased to the Waupun Historical Society in 1971.

The building was listed on the National Register of Historic Places in 1979 and on the State Register of Historic Places in 1989.

References

Libraries on the National Register of Historic Places in Wisconsin
National Register of Historic Places in Dodge County, Wisconsin
Carnegie libraries in Wisconsin
Historical society museums in Wisconsin
Museums in Dodge County, Wisconsin
Gothic Revival architecture in Wisconsin
Limestone buildings in the United States
Library buildings completed in 1904